Alburnoides idignensis, is a fish species of the family Cyprinidae endemic to Iran. It can be differentiated from its cogenerates by differences in fin ray and vertebral counts, together with other morphological characters. The specific name is derived from the Sumerian name for the River Tigris, "Idigna".

References

Further reading
Turan, Davut, et al. "Alburnoides manyasensis (Actinopterygii, Cyprinidae), a new species of cyprinid fish from Manyas Lake basin, Turkey." ZooKeys 276 (2013): 85.
Mousavi-Sabet, Hamed, Saber Vatandoust, and Ignacio Doadrio Villarejo. "Review of the genus Alburnoides Jeitteles, 1861 (Actinopterygii, Cyprinidae) from Iran with description of three new species from the Caspian Sea and Kavir basins." (2015).

Alburnoides
Taxa named by Nina Gidalevna Bogutskaya
Taxa named by Brian W. Coad
Fish described in 2009
Fish of Iran